Line 16 of the Shenzhen Metro is a metro line in north-eastern Shenzhen. It is opened on 28 December 2022.  It runs from Universiade in Longgang District to Tianxin in Pingshan District. It operates 24 stations and the line is 29.2 kilometers long.

Stations

Phase 2 (South extension)
The line is 9.53 km in length.

References

Shenzhen Metro lines
Transport infrastructure under construction in China
Railway lines opened in 2022